Sylvie Retailleau (née Galdin; born 24 February 1965) is a French politician who is currently serving as Minister of Higher Education in the Borne government since May 2022.

References 

1965 births
Living people
Women government ministers of France
Higher education ministers
21st-century French women politicians
People from Nice
French women physicists
Chevaliers of the Légion d'honneur
Officers of the Ordre national du Mérite
Members of the Borne government